The Levy Department Stores (French: Les galeries Lévy et Cie) is a 1932 French comedy film directed by André Hugon and starring Léon Belières, Charles Lamy and Alexandre Mihalesco. It was the first of three sequels to the 1930 film Levy and Company.

The film's sets were designed by Christian-Jaque.

Cast
 Léon Belières as Salomon Lévy  
 Charles Lamy as Moïse Lévy  
Alexandre Mihalesco as Le vieux Lévy 
 Simone Bourday as Rachel Meyer  
 Christiane Dor as Paulette  
 Doumel as César Patenolle  
 Rodolphe Marcilly 
 Micheline Masson 
 Émile Saint-Ober as Le garçon 
 Georges Zwingel

See also
 Moritz Makes His Fortune (German version, 1931)

References

Bibliography 
 Rège, Philippe. Encyclopedia of French Film Directors, Volume 1. Scarecrow Press, 2009.

External links 
 

1932 films
French comedy films
1930 comedy films
1930 films
1930s French-language films
Films directed by André Hugon
French multilingual films
Pathé films
French black-and-white films
1932 multilingual films
1932 comedy films
1930s French films